Kirill Pavlovich Florensky (27 December 1915 – 9 April 1982) was a Russian Soviet geochemist and planetologist.  He was head of comparative planetology at the Vernadsky Institute of the Soviet Academy of Sciences.

He was the second son of the Russian polymath, Pavel Florensky.

The crater Florensky on the Moon is named after him.

References

External links
 In Memoriam from the Earth, Moon, and Planets journal.

Soviet astronomers
Soviet geochemists
1915 births
1982 deaths